The Jon Spencer Blues Explosion is the debut album by the New York City-based eponymous band. Few copies of the album were produced; however, some songs are featured on the album Crypt Style, released one year after. Additionally, some songs are featured on the album A Reverse Willie Horton, released one year earlier, and considered either a bootleg or the group's true first album, as it contains all studio tracks. All three albums are culled from separate 1991 recording sessions with Kramer and Steve Albini.

Track listing

 "Write a Song" - 1:53
 "I.E.V." - 1:45
 "Exploder" - 2:00
 "Rachel" - 2:25
 "Chicken Walk" - 2:53
 "White Tail" - 2:31
 "'78 Style" - 1:26
 "Changed" - 1:05
 "What To Do" - 2:11
 "Eye To Eye" - 1:43
 "Eliza Jane" - 2:02
 "History Of Sex" - 1:46
 "Comeback" - 3:12
 "Support-A-Man" - 2:00
 "Maynard Ave." - 1:57
 "Feeling Of Love" - 1:47
 "Vacuum Of Loneliness" - 3:02
 "Intro A" - 0:52
 "Biological" - 2:10
 "Water Main" - 1:51

Personnel
The Jon Spencer Blues Explosion
 Jon Spencer - lead vocals, guitar, theremin
 Judah Bauer - guitar, backing vocals
 Russel Simins - drums
Additional Personnel
 Kurt Hoffmann - tenor saxophone
 Frank London - trumpet
 John Linnell - baritone saxophone

References

Jon Spencer Blues Explosion albums
1992 debut albums